Margherita Malatesta of the House of Malatesta (1370 – 28 February 1399) was the wife of Francesco I Gonzaga of the powerful House of Gonzaga, the ruler of Mantua in Northern Italy, whom she married in 1393. They were already related through the marriage of his sister, Elisabetta, to her brother, Carlo. Francesco's first wife Agnese Visconti had been executed for infidelity in 1391. Margherita and Francesco I were the parents of Gianfrancesco I the first Marquis of Mantua. Gianfrancesco married Paola Malatesta, daughter of Malatesta IV, in 1409.

The network of related women Margherita Malatesta, Alda d'Este, and Elisabetta and Margherita Gonzaga are considered to have tied together the courts of Mantua, Ferrara, Rimini and Pesaro. The Gonzaga family struck medals of Margherita. Margherita brought the hereditary disease of rickets to the Gonzagas, which manifested itself periodically in the lords of Mantua until the 16th century. She died on February 28, 1399, and was interred in Church of San Francesco in Mantua, in the mausoleum of the Gonzagas.

Issue 
Francesco and Margherita had two children:
 Gianfrancesco (1395–1444), his successor and the marquis of Mantua
 Susanna, who died young

Gallery

References

Bibliography

External links 

1370 births
1399 deaths
Nobility of Mantua
Margherita
14th-century Italian nobility
14th-century Italian women